Travis Air Force Base  is a United States Air Force base under the operational control of the Air Mobility Command (AMC), located three miles (5 km) east of the central business district of the city of Fairfield, in Solano County, California, United States.

Situated at the southwestern edge of the Sacramento Valley and known as the "Gateway to the Pacific," Travis Air Force Base handles more cargo and passenger traffic through its airport than any other military air terminal in the United States. The base has a long history of supporting humanitarian airlift operations at home and around the world. Today, Travis AFB includes approximately 7,260 active USAF military personnel, 4,250 Air Force Reserve personnel and 3,770 civilians.

Travis AFB has a major impact on the community as a number of military families and retirees have chosen to make Fairfield their permanent home. It is the largest employer in the city and Solano County as well, and the massive Travis workforce has a local economic impact of more than $1 billion annually. The base also contributes many highly skilled people to the local labor pool.

The base's host unit, the 60th Air Mobility Wing, is the largest wing in the Air Force's Air Mobility Command, with a versatile fleet of 26 C-5 Galaxies, 27 KC-10 Extenders, and 13 C-17 Globemaster III aircraft.

The base's former Strategic Air Command Alert Facility is now a U.S. Navy complex that typically supports two transient Navy E-6B Mercury TACAMO aircraft assigned to Fleet Air Reconnaissance Squadron THREE (VQ-3) Detachment and normally home-based at Tinker AFB, Oklahoma.

The base is also host to the David Grant USAF Medical Center, a 265-bed, $200 million Air Force teaching hospital, which serves both in-service and retired military personnel.

History
Originally named Fairfield-Suisun Army Air Base, construction began on Travis in 1942. Originally, medium attack bombers were supposed to be stationed at the base. The United States Navy had aircraft at the base for training, but this proved temporary. In October 1942, the War Department assigned the base to the Air Transport Command. The base's primary mission during World War II was ferrying aircraft and supplies to the Pacific Theater.

Following the end of World War II and the establishment of the U.S. Air Force as a separate service in 1947, the installation was renamed Fairfield-Suisun Air Force Base.

On 1 May 1949, the Strategic Air Command (SAC) became the parent major command for Travis AFB, turning it into a major long-range reconnaissance and intercontinental bombing installation for the 9th Bomb Group/9th Bomb Wing. For the next nine years, airlift operations became secondary while Travis served as home for SAC bombers such as the B-29 Superfortress, B-36 Peacemaker, and eventually, the B-52 Stratofortress. During this period, new hangars appeared, runways were added and widened, and permanent barracks and family living quarters were built.

The base was renamed Travis Air Force Base in 1951 for Brigadier General Robert F. Travis, who was killed when a B-29 Superfortress crashed shortly after takeoff on 5 August 1950. The ensuing fire caused the 10,000 pounds of high explosives in the plane's cargo — a Mark 4 nuclear weapon — to detonate, killing General Travis and 18 others. (The bomb's plutonium pit was being transported in a different plane.)

The Military Air Transport Service (MATS) resumed command of Travis AFB on 1 July 1958, after SAC's new dispersal policy led to the transfer of the 14th Air Division to Beale AFB, California and the 1501st Air Transport Wing (Heavy) became the host unit. On 1 January 1966, MATS was redesignated as the Military Airlift Command (MAC) and on 6 January 1966, the 60th Military Airlift Wing (60 MAW) replaced the 1501st ATW as the host unit.

As Travis was an important SAC base, it received anti-aircraft defenses in the 1950s. The 436th Anti-Aircraft Artillery Battalion was active by 1955. The 436th AAAB was redesignated as an antiaircraft artillery missile battalion on 5 January 1957 and subsequently occupied four Nike Ajax sites, which went to 1st Missile Battalion, 61st Artillery on 1 September 1958. Controlling the SAMs was the 29th Artillery Group (Air Defense).

Over the next three decades, Travis would become known as the "Gateway to the Pacific" in its role as the principal military airlift hub in the western United States. Initially equipped with legacy C-124 Globemaster and C-133 Cargomaster aircraft from the 1501st, the year 1966 would also see the 60 MAW introduce the Air Force's new all-jet heavy airlifter, the C-141 Starlifter. In 1969, the 349th Military Airlift Wing (349 MAW) of the Air Force Reserve (AFRES) was also established as an "Associate" wing to the 60 MAW, with both units sharing the same aircraft and eventually seamlessly mixing flight crews, maintenance crews and other support personnel. In 1970, the 60 MAW and 349 MAW (Assoc) would begin concurrently operating the Air Force's largest airlift aircraft, the C-5 Galaxy. In 1991, the 60 MAW was redesignated as the 60th Airlift Wing (60 AW) and the 349 MAW was redesignated as the 349th Airlift Wing (349 AW) the following year.

In 1992, with the reorganization of the Air Force following the end of the Cold War, Military Airlift Command (MAC) was inactivated and Travis came under the control of the newly established Air Mobility Command (AMC). With the concurrent inactivation of Strategic Air Command (SAC) and the transfer of most of SAC's air refueling aircraft to AMC, the 60 AW gained KC-10 Extender aircraft that had been previously assigned to March AFB, California. With the inclusion of an aerial refueling mission into its long-time strategic airlift mission, the 60 AW and the 349 AW were redesignated as the 60th Air Mobility Wing (60 AMW) and the 349th Air Mobility Wing (349 AMW), the designations they continue to hold today. In 1997, the 349 AMW (Assoc) also became part of the newly established Air Force Reserve Command (AFRC) while remaining operationally "gained" by AMC.

In 1997, the 60 AMW also shed its C-141 aircraft, which were transferred to other Air Force, AFRC and Air National Guard (ANG) wings, while retaining its C-5 and KC-10 aircraft. In 2006, the 60 AMW and 349 AMW (Assoc) again acquired a third aircraft type in their inventory with the arrival of the C-17 Globemaster III.

In January 2017, the Air Force announced that Travis Air Force Base had been selected as a future Boeing KC-46 Pegasus base and will receive a complement of 24 of the new aerial refueling aircraft.  

In March 2018, a vehicle filled with propane tanks rammed through the base's main gate and drove into a ditch. Then, the driver ignited a fire inside, causing the vehicle to explode and kill himself. This resulted in the main gate being closed for twelve hours. The driver was later identified as Hafiz Kazi, a 51-year-old Indian-born San Francisco Bay Area resident who had been a legal permanent resident of the U.S. since 1993. The FBI's Sacramento Field Office and the United States Air Force Office of Special Investigations investigated the incident as an act of terrorism, but they said they did not find any evidence of religious affiliations.

Role and operations 

The base's host unit, the 60th Air Mobility Wing, is the largest wing in the Air Force's Air Mobility Command, with a versatile fleet of 26 C-5 Galaxies, 27 KC-10 Extenders, and 13 C-17 Globemaster III aircraft.

In addition, the base's former Strategic Air Command Alert Facility is now a U.S. Navy complex that typically supports two transient Navy E-6B Mercury TACAMO aircraft assigned to Fleet Air Reconnaissance Squadron THREE (VQ-3) Detachment and normally home-based at Tinker AFB, Oklahoma.

The base is also host to David Grant USAF Medical Center, a 265-bed, $200 million Air Force teaching hospital, which serves both in-service and retired military personnel.

Maintenance squadrons

60th Aircraft Maintenance Squadron
The 60th Aircraft Maintenance Squadron provides combat-ready maintenance personnel and organizational support to inspect, service, and repair 26 assigned C-5 aircraft, and maintenance support for Transient Alert. It generates 24-hour-a-day strategic airlift to support four flying squadrons and ensures readiness of personnel and equipment for deployment. It maintains mission ready aircraft capable of worldwide strategic airlift supporting AMC's global mission.

660th Aircraft Maintenance Squadron
The 660th Aircraft Maintenance Squadron provides combat-ready maintenance personnel and organizational support to inspect, service, and repair all transient and 27 assigned KC-10A aircraft, 46% of DOD's inventory. It generates aerial refueling and strategic airlift to support flying activities of four aerial refueling squadrons. It ensures readiness of personnel and equipment for deployment. It maintains mission capable aircraft supporting AMC's global mission.

60th Maintenance Squadron

The 60th Maintenance Squadron provides organizational and field-level repair, maintenance, inspection and refurbishment of 26 C-5, 27 KC-10 and 13 C-17 aircraft. It inspects, services, and overhauls 674 units of aerospace ground equipment worth over $12 million. It manages a 55-acre munitions storage area. It provides mission capable aircraft in direct support of AMC's global mission. It inspects, services, and overhauls aircraft fuel systems. It maintains avionic, hydraulic, electrical and environmental system components for C-5 and C-17 aircraft. It calibrates and repairs over 8,800 items in a regional test, measurement, and diagnostic equipment laboratory. It directly supports AMC's global reach mission for AMC's largest wing.

60th Maintenance Operations Squadron
The 60th Maintenance Operations Squadron provides critical support for the maintenance, modification and scheduling of 26 C-5 and 27 KC-10 aircraft valued at $9 billion. It controls maintenance actions and manages all aircraft and mission statistics. It manages $340 million in real property and provides group-level mobility support for AMC's largest wing. It develops and executes aircraft/ancillary training and provides aircraft maintenance training support for the Pacific Rim.

860th Aircraft Maintenance Squadron
The 860th Aircraft Maintenance Squadron provides combat-ready maintenance personnel and organizational support to inspect, service, and repair 13 assigned C-17A aircraft, and maintenance support for Transient Alert. It generates 24-hour-a-day strategic airlift to support two flying squadrons and ensures readiness of personnel and equipment for deployment. It maintains mission ready aircraft capable of worldwide strategic airlift supporting AMC's global mission.

Based units 
Flying and notable non-flying units are based at Travis Air Force Base.

Units marked GSU are Geographically Separate Units, which although based at Travis are subordinate to a parent unit based at another location.

United States Air Force 

Air Mobility Command (AMC)

 Eighteenth Air Force
 60th Air Mobility Wing (host wing)
 Headquarters 60th Air Mobility Wing
 60th Comptroller Squadron
 60th Operations Group
 6th Air Refueling Squadron – KC-10A Extender
 9th Air Refueling Squadron – KC-10A Extender
 21st Airlift Squadron – C-17A Globemaster III
 22nd Airlift Squadron – C-5M Galaxy
 60th Operations Support Squadron
 60th Aeromedical Evacuation Squadron
 60th Maintenance Group
 60th Aerial Port Squadron
 60th Aircraft Maintenance Squadron
 60th Maintenance Squadron
 60th Maintenance Operation Squadron
 660th Aircraft Maintenance Squadron
 860th Aircraft Maintenance Squadron
 60th Medical Group
 60th Aerospace Medicine Squadron
 60th Dental Squadron
 60th Diagnostics & Therapeutics Squadron
 60th Inpatient Squadron
 60th Medical Operations Squadron
 60th Medical Support Squadron
 60th Surgical Operations Squadron
 David Grant USAF Medical Center
 60th Mission Support Group
 60th Civil Engineer Squadron
 60th Communications Squadron
 60th Contracting Squadron
 60th Force Support Squadron
 60th Logistics Readiness Squadron
 60th Security Forces Squadron
 US Air Force Expeditionary Center
 621st Contingency Response Wing
 621st Air Mobility Advisory Group (GSU)
 321st Air Mobility Operations Squadron
 571st Mobility Support Advisory Squadron
 821st Contingency Response Group (GSU)
 821st Contingency Response Squadron
 821st Contingency Response Support Squadron

Air Force Reserve Command (AFRC)

 Fourth Air Force
 349th Air Mobility Wing
 Headquarters 349th Air Mobility Wing
 349th Operations Group
 70th Air Refueling Squadron – KC-10A Extender
 79th Air Refueling Squadron – KC-10A Extender
 301st Airlift Squadron – C-17A Globemaster III
 312th Airlift Squadron – C-5M Galaxy
 349th Aeromedical Evacuation Squadron
 349th Operations Support Squadron
 349th Air Mobility Operations Squadron
 349th Maintenance Group
 349th Aircraft Maintenance Squadron
 349th Maintenance Operations Flight
 349th Maintenance Squadron
 749th Aircraft Maintenance Squadron
 945th Aircraft Maintenance Squadron
 349th Medical Group
 349th Aerospace Medicine Squadron
 349th Aeromedical Staging Squadron
 349th Medical Squadron
 349th Mission Support Group
 45th Aerial Port Squadron
 55th Aerial Port Squadron
 82nd Aerial Port Squadron
 349th Civil Engineer Squadron
 349th Logistics Readiness Squadron
 349th Force Support Squadron
 349th Security Forces Squadron

United States Navy 
Commander, Naval Air Forces (COMNAVAIRFOR)

 Strategic Communications Wing ONE
 Fleet Air Reconnaissance Squadron THREE (VQ-3)
 Detachment (GSU) – E-6B Mercury

US Fleet Forces Command (USFF)

 US Naval Information Forces
 Naval Computer and Telecommunications Area Master Station, Pacific
 Naval Computer and Telecommunication Station San Diego
 Naval Computer and Telecommunications Strategic Communications Unit
 NCTSCU Detachment Fairfield (GSU)

Defense Threat Reduction Agency (DTRA) 

 DTRA Travis

Museum
Travis AFB is host to the Travis Air Force Base Heritage Center, one of the largest collections of military aircraft on the west coast.

The Museum of Military Aviation History has a representative collection of American military aircraft from various periods: fighters, bombers, trainers, cargo and liaison aircraft. Its exhibits showcase Jimmy Doolittle and the Tokyo Raiders, the 15th AF in WW II, the Tuskegee Airmen, the Consairways story, the Berlin Airlift, and the history of Travis AFB with special emphasis on the Korean War, the Vietnam War, and other significant military missions.

Other exhibits include a space capsule for children, air force uniforms, the nose of a WWII glider, WWII aircraft recognition models, a Link Trainer, aircraft engines, and the cockpits of a T-28, a T-37, and an F-100.

Airlines

Cargo

In popular culture
John D. MacDonald, author of the best-selling Travis McGee suspense novels, has written that he specifically named his protagonist after the Air Force base.

Larry Bond mentions Travis AFB in his 1989 techno-thriller Red Phoenix, as the Army's elite 7th Infantry Division's deployment point, from their base at Fort Ord, to reinforce the Eighth Army in the Republic of Korea after the North Korean invasion.

See also
 California World War II Army Airfields

References

External links 

Travis Air Museum  (JDASM Foundation)
Jimmy Doolittle Air & Space Museum  (JDASM Foundation)

Installations of the United States Air Force in California
Airports in Solano County, California
Military airbases established in 1951
Buildings and structures in Solano County, California
Installations of Strategic Air Command